The 2004 North Dakota Democratic presidential caucuses were held on February 3 along with six other states. Frontrunner John Kerry had earlier won New Mexico, Missouri, Arizona and Delaware by large margins. Army General Wesley Clark had hoped to win some primaries this day but got only second and third place finishes. Howard Dean just months earlier Dean had narrowly been leading in polls over Wesley Clark. The endorsements were former governor George A. Sinner who endorsed Wesley Clark. The results were Kerry with 51% to Wesley 24% and Dean at 12%.

Results

References

North Dakota
2004 North Dakota elections
2004